Hortenzia Szrnka (born 28 May 1981 in Gyula) is a former Hungarian international handball player. She played many years for Dunaferr SE and Fehérvár KC during her career. She played in Germany for Frankfurter HC and Nürnberg HC.

Achievements 

 Nemzeti Bajnokság I:
 Winner: 2001, 2003
 Magyar Kupa:
 Winner: 2000, 2002
 World Championship:
 Silver Medalist: 2003

References

External links 
 

1981 births
Living people
Hungarian female handball players
20th-century Hungarian women
People from Gyula
Sportspeople from Békés County